Al Fahid Island is a natural island located off the coast of Abu Dhabi island.

Features  
Al Fahid Island is a mixed-purpose community with both residential, retail and commercial units. It is a 3.4 million square metre land bank. Aldar bought Al Fahid Island for $680m. It is Located between Yas Island and Saadiyat Island.

References 

Persian Gulf